The ambassador of Great Britain to Russia was the foremost diplomatic representative in Russia of the Kingdom of Great Britain, a state created in 1707 by the Union of England and Scotland. The British ambassador was the head of the diplomatic mission in Russia. The Embassy was a prestigious posting in the British foreign service.

For ambassadors up to 1707, see List of ambassadors of the Kingdom of England to Russia. For ambassadors after 1800, see List of ambassadors of the United Kingdom to Russia.

Minister and Ambassador
 1707-1712 : Charles Goodfellow Minister and Consul-General (previously Minister to Russia of the Kingdom of England, 1699-1707).
 1707-1712 : Charles Whitworth, Envoy of the Kingdom of England 1704-1707 and of Great Britain, 1707-1709; Ambassador extraordinary 1709-1711; Ambassador extraordinary and plenipotentiary 1711-1712

Ministers Resident
 1714-1719 : Friedrich Christian Weber 
 1714-1715 : George Mackenzie-Quin
 1715-1716 : James Haldane Minister Resident
 1716      : George Douglas, 2nd Earl of Dumbarton
 1718-1721 : James Jeffreys (retired to Dantzig in 1719)
 1719-1730 : No diplomatic relations
 1728-1731 : Thomas Ward
 1731 : John Campbell, 3rd Earl of Breadalbane and Holland 
 1731-1739 : Claudius Rondeau Consul-General 1730-1731; Minister Resident
1733-1734 : George, Lord Forbes Minister Plenipotentiary to negotiate a commercial treaty

Envoys Extraordinary and Plenipotentiary
 1739-1742 : Edward Finch
 1741-1744 : Cyril Wich or Wyche, Bt Envoy Extraordinary 1741-1742; then Envoy Extraordinary and Plenipotentiary
 1744-1749 : John Carmichael, 3rd Earl of Hyndford Minister Plenipotentiary 1744-1745; then Ambassador Extraordinary and Plenipotentiary
 1749-1755 : Melchior Guy Dickens
 1755-1759 : Charles Hanbury Williams Ambassador Plenipotentiary
 1759-1762 : Robert Murray Keith the Elder (d. 1774)
 1762-1765 : John Hobart, 2nd Earl of Buckinghamshire Ambassador Extraordinary
 1764-1767 : George Macartney, 1st Earl Macartney Envoy Extraordinary
 1766-1767 : Rt. Hon. Hans Stanley (never went to Russia)
 1767-1768 : Henry Shirley Secretary in charge or agent
 1768-1772 : Charles Cathcart, 9th Lord Cathcart Ambassador Extrraordinary
 1772-1775 : Robert Gunning
 1776-1783 : Sir James Harris
 1783-1788 : Alleyne Fitzherbert
 1788-1800 : Charles Whitworth
 1791 : William Fawkener Special Mission
1800-1801: Diplomatic relations were suspended during the Second League of Armed Neutrality

References

 

Russia
Great Britain